Thomas Lamb Beals (August 1850 – October 2, 1915) was an American Major League Baseball player in the National Association of Professional Base Ball Players and the National League.  He played mostly in the outfield and at second base for the Washington Olympics, Washington Blue Legs, Boston Red Stockings, and Chicago White Stockings from 1871 to 1880.

Beals made his debut for the Olympics playing under the name W. Thomas on July 27, 1871. The Olympics franchise did not last beyond nine games into their 1872 schedule, and Beals was able to join the Blue Stockings the next season as a second baseman/catcher. He had the best season of his career, hitting .272 with a career-high 24 RBI on 46 hits.

In 1874, Beals started playing under his given name with the perennially powerful Red Stockings. As a part-time second baseman/outfielder, he only managed to hit .196. He reprised his part-time role in the Boston outfield the next season but significantly increased his production, hitting .265. After that 1875 season, the National Association became the National League, and Beals was without a job in Major League Baseball for the next four seasons.

Beals reemerged in 1880 with the White Stockings at age 29. He played 13 games for the Chicago club that season, hitting a career-low .152, and hung up his spikes after the season.  Beals died, at the age of 65, on October 2, 1915 in San Francisco, California, and he is interred at Cypress Lawn Memorial Park in Colma, California.

References

External links

Major League Baseball outfielders
Major League Baseball second basemen
Morrisania Unions players
Chicago White Stockings players
Washington Olympics players
Washington Blue Legs players
Boston Red Stockings players
Baseball players from New York (state)
19th-century baseball players
1850 births
1915 deaths
San Francisco Mutuals players
Oakland Pioneers players